Julius Büdel (8 August 1903 – 28 August 1983) was a German geomorphologist noted for his work on the influence of climate in shaping landscapes and landforms. In his work Büdel stressed the importance of inherited landforms in present-day landscapes and argued that many landforms are the result of a combination of processes, and not of a single process. Büdel estimated that 95% of mid-latitude landforms are relict. Büdel studied both cold-climate processes in Svalbard and "tropical" weathering processes in India to understand the origin of the relief of Central Europe, which he argued was a palimpsest of landforms formed at different times and under different climates. For Central Europe Büdel concluded that in Late Cretaceous to Early Pliocene times etchplains formed. Then in Late Pliocene to Early Pleistocene times a transition period occurred in landscape forming processes. Finally in the Late Pleistocene periglaciation and deep permafrost made Central Europe a place of "excessive valley cutting". Holocene developments would not have affected much of the landscape other than adding a deep soil cover.

Through his life Büdel published three influential morphoclimatic zoning schemes. The first, in 1948, was followed by another in 1963, and a final version in 1977. Büdel's schemes emphasise planation and valley-cutting in relation to climate, arguing that valley-cutting is dominant in subpolar regions while planation is so in the tropics.

Much of Büdel's 1977 book Klima-geomorphologie was considered outdated as of 2006. However its pioneering approaches make it a classic in geomorphological literature.

The Büdel Islands in Antarctica were named after him.

See also
André Cailleux
Jan Dylik
Jean Tricart

References

Climatic geomorphologists
German geographers
German climatologists
1983 deaths
1903 births
German geomorphologists
Academic staff of the University of Würzburg
Victoria Medal recipients
20th-century geographers